IDN can refer to:

 Internationalized domain names
 Institut Industriel du Nord, the former name of École Centrale de Lille
 Indonesia, the ISO 3-letter country code
 International Data Number, in the context of an X.121 address
 Identity driven networking
 Integrated data network, the digital data network developed by Reuters and dedicated to financial markets
 Integrated Delivery Network, a network of healthcare organizations, see IDS
 Intradermal nevus, a type of skin mole

See also
 I Don't Know (disambiguation) - sometimes abbreviated as "IDN"